The Dallas Mavericks are an American professional basketball team based in Dallas. They play in the Southwest Division of the Western Conference in the National Basketball Association (NBA). The team joined the NBA in 1980 as an expansion team and won their first NBA championship in 2011. The Mavericks have played their home games at the American Airlines Center since 2001. Their principal owner is Mark Cuban. Their current staff includes Nico Harrison as general manager and Jason Kidd as head coach.

Dirk Nowitzki, who played his entire NBA career with the Mavericks starting in 1998, is the franchise's longest-serving player. He played more games, played more minutes, scored more points, and recorded more rebounds than any other Maverick. He also leads the franchise in field goals made, three-pointers made, and free throws made. His achievements include the Most Valuable Player Award in 2007, Finals Most Valuable Player Award in 2011, 14 All-Star Game selections, and 12 consecutive All-NBA Team selections.

Other prominent Mavericks include Steve Nash, who was selected to two All-NBA Teams and two All-Star Games. He and Luka Dončić are the only other Mavericks who have been selected to the All-NBA Team. Rolando Blackman and Mark Aguirre were selected to four and three All-Star games, respectively, and Dončić has been selected to three as of 2022. Five other players, James Donaldson, Michael Finley, Chris Gatling, Josh Howard, and Jason Kidd, were selected to the All-Star Game at least once during their Mavericks careers. Three Mavericks have won the NBA Sixth Man of the Year Award: Roy Tarpley in 1988, Antawn Jamison in 2004, and Jason Terry in 2009. Ten players were selected to the All-Rookie Team, including Kidd, who won the Rookie of the Year Award in 1995, and Dončić, who earned the distinction in 2019. Three players, Adrian Dantley, Alex English, and Dennis Rodman, have been inducted to the Basketball Hall of Fame, although all of them spent most of their careers elsewhere, and each spent less than two seasons with the Mavericks. Guard Derek Harper, who played 12 seasons with the Mavericks during two separate stints, is the franchise leader in assists and steals. Before being passed by Nowitzki, the blocked shots category was led by center Shawn Bradley, who once led the league in blocks.

The Mavericks have four retired jersey numbers: the number 12 jersey worn by Derek Harper, the number 15 jersey worn by Brad Davis, the number 22 jersey worn by Rolando Blackman, and the number 41 jersey worn by Dirk Nowitzki. Davis, who played 12 seasons with the Mavericks until his retirement in 1992, had his number 15 jersey retired by the franchise in November 1992. Blackman, who played 11 seasons with the Mavericks after being selected by the team in the 1981 draft, had his number 22 jersey retired in March 2000. Harper, who played parts of 12 seasons in two stints with the Mavericks starting with the 1983 draft, had his number 12 jersey retired in January 2018. Nowitzki had his number 41 jersey retired in January 2022.

List
Note: Statistics are correct as of February 24, 2023.

International players

In the National Basketball Association (NBA), foreign players—also known as international players—are those who were born outside of the United States. Players who were born in U.S. overseas territories, such as Puerto Rico, U.S. Virgin Islands and Guam, are considered international players even if they are U.S. citizens. In some borderline cases, the NBA takes into consideration whether a player desires to be identified as international. 45 international players have played for the Mavericks. The first foreign-born Maverick is Rolando Blackman, who was born in Panama. However, he grew up in the United States and was drafted from Kansas State University in 1981. In the 1985 draft, the Mavericks selected three foreign players in the first round; German forward Detlef Schrempf, Canadian center Bill Wennington and German center Uwe Blab.

In , the Mavericks acquired Canadian guard Steve Nash from the Phoenix Suns and the draft rights to German forward Dirk Nowitzki from the Milwaukee Bucks. Nash and Nowitzki quickly became the cornerstone of the franchise and in  they led the Mavericks to their first playoffs in 11 years. In the 1999 draft, the Mavericks drafted Chinese center Wang Zhizhi. After almost two years of negotiation with Wang's Chinese team, he was finally signed in April 2001 and became the first Chinese player to play the NBA.

The following is a list of international players who have played for the Mavericks, listed by their national team affiliation.

 Australia
 Chris Anstey

 The Bahamas
 Dexter Cambridge

 Belgium
 Didier Ilunga-Mbenga (born in Zaire (now DR Congo), became a naturalized Belgian citizen, represented Belgium internationally)

 Brazil
 João Vianna

 Canada
 Samuel Dalembert (born in Haiti, became a naturalized Canadian citizen, represented Canada internationally)
 Jamaal Magloire (born in Canada but never represented Canada internationally)
 Steve Nash (born in South Africa to an English father and a Welsh mother, grew up in Canada, became a naturalized Canadian citizen, represented Canada internationally)
 Dwight Powell
 Bill Wennington

 China
 Wang Zhizhi
 Yi Jianlian

 Croatia
 Bruno Šundov (born in SR Croatia, SFR Yugoslavia (now Croatia), represented Croatia internationally at youth level)

 Dominican Republic
 Charlie Villanueva (born in the United States, represents Dominican Republic internationally)

 Estonia
 Martin Müürsepp

 France
 Tariq Abdul-Wahad
 Alexis Ajinça
 Rodrigue Beaubois
 Ian Mahinmi
 Frank Ntilikina
 Antoine Rigaudeau

 Georgia
 Zaza Pachulia

 Germany
 Uwe Blab (born in West Germany, also represented West Germany internationally before the reunification)
 Shawn Bradley (born in West Germany to American parents, grew up in the United States, represented Germany internationally)
 Chris Kaman (born in the United States, represents Germany internationally)
 Maxi Kleber (born in Germany)
 Dirk Nowitzki (born in West Germany)
 Detlef Schrempf (born in West Germany, also represented West Germany internationally before the reunification)

 Great Britain
 James Donaldson (born in England but never represented England or Great Britain internationally)
 Pops Mensah-Bonsu

 Guyana
 Rawle Marshall (born in Guyana but never represented Guyana internationally)

 Israel
 Gal Mekel

 Latvia
 Davis Bertans
 Kristaps Porzingis

 Mexico
 Eduardo Nájera

 Nigeria
 Josh Akognon (born in the United States, represents Nigeria internationally)
 Al-Farouq Aminu (born in the United States, represents Nigeria internationally)
 Obinna Ekezie

 Puerto Rico
 J. J. Barea

 Russia
 Pavel Podkolzin (represented Russia internationally at youth level)

 Senegal
 DeSagana Diop
 Mamadou N'Diaye

 Serbia and Montenegro / FR Yugoslavia
 Radisav Ćurčić (born in SR Serbia, SFR Yugoslavia (now Serbia), represented SFR Yugoslavia internationally)
 Predrag Danilović (born in SR Bosnia and Herzegovina, SFR Yugoslavia (now Bosnia and Herzegovina), represented SFR Yugoslavia and FR Yugoslavia internationally)
 Sasha Pavlović (born in SR Montenegro, SFR Yugoslavia (now Montenegro), represented FR Yugoslavia internationally)
 Peja Stojaković (born in SR Croatia, SFR Yugoslavia (now Croatia), represented FR Yugoslavia and Serbia and Montenegro internationally)

 Slovenia
 Luka Dončić

 Spain
 José Calderón

 Tunisia
 Salah Mejri

 United States
 Kelenna Azubuike (born in England to Nigerian parents, grew up in the United States, but does not hold British citizenship and never represented either England, Great Britain, Nigeria or United States internationally)
 Rolando Blackman (born in Panama, grew up in the United States, became a naturalized U.S. citizen, represented the United States internationally)
 Wallace Bryant (born in Spain, has dual U.S. and Spanish citizenships but never represented either United States or Spain internationally)

 U.S. Virgin Islands
 Raja Bell

Statistics leaders
Note: Statistics are correct as of the middle of the 2022–23 NBA regular season.

Games

Minutes

Points

Field goals

3-point field goals

Free throws

Rebounds

Blocks

Assists

Steals

Single game leaders

Source: https://stathead.com/tiny/50L9i

Source:https://stathead.com/tiny/hZ75o

Source:https://stathead.com/tiny/YQ8L6

Notes
 Players can sometimes be assigned more than one jersey number.
 Each year is linked to an article about that particular NBA season.
 Only includes achievements as Mavericks players.

References
General

 
 
 
 
 

Specific

External links
Official website

National Basketball Association all-time rosters

roster and statistics leaders